Members of the North Carolina General Assembly of 1899–1900 were elected in November 1898.  The election saw the Democratic Party return to majority status in both houses, replacing the fusion of Republicans and Populists. After this election, Democrats dominated state politics for the next seventy-plus years, in part due to the 1899–1900 legislature disfranchising African-Americans.

House of Representatives

House leadership

House members

The 118 House of Representative members and their party affiliation are listed below:
Alamance: W. H. Carroll  (Dem)
Alexander:  Alexander C. McIntosh (Dem)
Alleghany:  James M. Gambill (Dem)
Anson:  James A. Leak (Dem)
Ashe:  B. E. Reeves (Dem)
Beaufort:  B. B. Nicholson (Dem)
Bertie: Francis D. Winston (Dem)
Bladen: George H. Currie (Dem)
Brunswick: D. B. McNeill (Dem)
Buncombe: Locke Craig (Dem)
Buncombe: J. C. Curtis (Dem)
Burke: Julius H. Hoffman (Dem)
Cabarrus: Luther T. Hartsell (Dem)
Caldwell: Samuel L. Patterson (Dem)
Camden: John K. Abbott (Dem)
Carteret: John B. Russell (Dem)
Caswell: Charles J. Yarborough  (Rep)
Catawba: A. C. Boggs (Dem)
Chatham: Los L. Wrenn  (Rep)
Chatham: J. A. Giles  (Rep)
Cherokee: W. E. Manney (Dem)
Chowan: W. Dorsey Welch (Dem)
Clay: George M. Fleming (Dem)
Cleveland: Clyde R. Hoey (Dem)
Columbus:  D. C. Allen (Dem)
Craven: Isaac H. Smith  (Rep)
Cumberland: D. J. Ray (Dem)
Cumberland: H. McD. Robinson (Dem)
Curritick: Samuel M. Beasley (Dem)
Dare: Charles T. Williams (Dem)
Davidson: Charles M. Thompson (Dem)
Davie: Gaston L. White  (Rep)
Duplin: James O. Carr (Dem)
Durham: Howard A. Foushee (Dem)
Edgecombe: Henry A. Gilliam (Dem)
Forsyth: J. K. P. Carter  (Rep)
Forsyth: William A. Lowery (Rep)
Franklin: P. A. Davis (Dem)
Gaston: L. H. J. Hauser (Dem)
Gates: John M. Trotman (Dem)
Graham: O. P. Williams  (Rep)
Granville: C. W. Bryan (Dem)
Granville: A. A. Lyon (Dem)
Greene: John E. W. Sugg (Dem)
Guilford: John C. Kennett (Dem)
Guilford: John C. Bunch (Dem)
Halifax: H. S. Harrison (Dem)
Halifax: W. P. White (Dem)
Harnett: Dan Hugh McLean (Dem)
Haywood: Joseph S. Davis (Dem)
Henderson: M. S. Justus  (Rep)
Hertford: Isaac F. Snipes  (Rep)
Hyde: Claude W. Davis (Dem)
Iredell: John B. Holman (Dem)
Iredell: Thomas J. Williams (Dem)
Jackson: Walter E. Moore (Dem)
Johnston: J. F. Brown (Dem)
Johnston: D. G. Johnson (Dem)
Jones: G. G. Noble (Dem)
Lenoir: W. W. Carraway (Dem)
Lincoln: John F. Rheinhart (Dem)
McDowell: Edward J. Justice (Dem)
Macon: J. Frank Ray (Dem)
Madison: A. B. Bryant  (Rep)
Martin: Harry W. Stubbs (Dem)
Mecklenburg: Heriot Clarkson (Dem)
Mecklenburg: J. E. Henderson (Dem)
Mecklenburg: R. M. Ransom (Dem)
Mitchell: J. R. Pritchard  (Rep)
Montgomery: W. A. Cochran (Dem)
Moore: John L. Currie (Dem)
Nash: Cicero T. Ellen (Dem)
New Hanover: George Rountree (Dem)
New Hanover:  Martin S. Willard (Dem)
Northampton: W. C. Coates  (Rep)
Onslow: Frank Thompson (Dem)
Orange: Samuel M. Gattis (Dem)
Pamlico: George Dees  (Dem)
Pasquotank: J. B. Leigh  (Dem)
Pender: Gibson James  (Dem)
Perquimans: F. H. Nicholson  (Rep)
Person: Charles A. Whitfield  (Dem)
Pitt: W. J. Nichols  (Dem)
Pitt: T. H. Barnhill  (Dem)
Polk: J. W. McFarland  (Rep)
Randolph: T. J. Redding  (Dem)
Randolph: J. M. Burrow  (Rep)
Richmond: Henry Clay Wall  (Dem)
Robeson: Gilbert B. Patterson  (Dem)
Robeson: James S. Oliver (Dem)
Rockingham: J. H. Lane  (Dem)
Rockingham: J. R. Garrett  (Dem)
Rowan: Lee Slater Overman  (Dem)
Rowan: D. R. Julian  (Dem)
Rutherford: J. F. Alexander  (Dem)
Sampson: Robert M. Crumpler  (Pop)
Sampson: Cicero H. Johnson  (Pop)
Stanly: J. M. Brown  (Dem)
Stokes: Riley J. Petree  (Rep)
Surry: William W. Hampton  (Rep)
Swain: R. L. Leatherwood  (Dem)
Transylvania: George W. Wilson  (Dem)
Tyrrell: William Maitland  (Dem)
Union: R. L. Stevens (Dem)
Vance: J. Y. Eaton  (Rep)
Wake: John D. Boushall  (Dem)
Wake: Gaston Powell  (Dem)
Wake: W. H. Holland  (Dem)
Warren: J. H. Wright  (Rep)
Washington: T. L. Tarkenton  (Pop)
Watauga: W. B. Council, Jr.  (Dem)
Wayne: William R. Allen  (Dem)
Wayne: J. M. Wood  (Dem)
Wilkes: E. B. Hendren  (Rep)
Wilkes: W. A. Tharpe  (Rep)
Wilson: Henry G. Connor (Dem)
Yadkin: H. S. Williams  (Rep)
Yancey: W. M. Austin  (Dem)

Senate

Senate leadership

Senate members

Senators and their home county are listed below:
District 1: George Cowper of Hertford;  T. G. Skinner of Perquimans
District 2: I. W. Miller of Pamlico; H. S. Ward of Washington
District 3: W. E. Harris of Northampton
District 4: Edward L. Travis of Halifax
District 5: R. H. Speight of Edgecombe
District 6: F. G. James of Pitt
District 7: T. S. Collie  Nash; R. A. P. Cooley of Nash
District 8: James A. Bryan of Craven; John Q. Jackson of Lenoir
District 9: Frank A. Daniels of Wayne; Isham F. Hill of Duplin
District 10: W. J. Davis of Brunswick
District 11: Thomas O. Fuller of Warren
District 12: F. A. Whitaker of Wake (Dem)
District 13: J. A. T. Jones of Johnston
District 14: J. W. S. Robinson of Sampson; Frank P. Jones of Harnett
District 15: Joseph A. Brown of Columbus; Stephen McIntyre of Robeson
District 16: W. L. Williams of Cumberland
District 17: Archibald A. Hicks of Granville
District 18: Thomas M. Cheek of Orange; J. M. Satterfield of Caswell
District 19: J. A. Goodwin of Chatham
District 20: William Lindsay of Rockingham
District 21: John N. Wilson of Guilford
District 22: J. C. Black of Moore
District 23: Thomas J. Jerome of Union; Charles Stanback of Montgomery
District 24: R. L. Smith of Stanly (Dem)
District 25: Frank I. Osborne of Mecklenburg
District 26: Robert Broadnax Glenn of Forsyth (Dem); John C. Thomas of Davidson
District 27: James A. Butler of Iredell; Frank C. Hairston of Davie
District 28: J. C. Newsom of Stokes
District 29: H. T. Campbell of Alexander
District 30: William C. Fields of Ashe
District 31: W. L. Lambert of Mitchell; G. G. Eaves of McDowell
District 32: M. H. Justice of Rutherford; Oscar F. Mason of Gaston
District 33: William J. Cocke of Buncombe; Thomas J. Murray of Madison
District 34: J. A. Franks of Swain
District 35: Joel L. Crisp of Graham

See also
 North Carolina General Assembly
 List of North Carolina state legislatures

References

External links
UNC Libraries Election of 1898

1899-1900
General Assembly
General Assembly
 1899
 1899
1899 U.S. legislative sessions
1900 U.S. legislative sessions